Willow Wood may refer to:

 Willow Wood, Ohio, United States
 Willow Wood Subdivision, Alberta, Canada
 WillowWood School in Toronto, Ontario, Canada
 Willowood, Texas, United States
 The wood of a willow tree

See also
 Willow (disambiguation)